Hume (formerly, Humes) is an unincorporated community in Fresno County, California. Hume is located in the 93628 ZIP Code, in area code 559.

Hume is situated on the south shore of Hume Lake in the Sequoia National Forest, not far from the west entrance to Kings Canyon National Park. Much of the community and the lake is devoted to the tourism industry.

Many of Hume's residents live in the Hume Lake Subdivision.

Hume has been characterized as the "most conservative community" in the state of California.

The largest facility at the lake is Hume Lake Christian Camps a Christian camp and conference center.

History 
The Hume Lake Subdivision was built to finance the development of Hume Lake Christian Camps. John Strain conducted the original surveys for the subdivision and Don French built the roads and water systems. 247 lots were subdivided on 99 year leases.

A post office operated at Hume from 1908 to 1924, and from 1938 to the present.

By 1986 over 230 homes were constructed in the Hume Lake Subdivision.

References

 
 
 

Populated places established in 1908
Unincorporated communities in California
Unincorporated communities in Fresno County, California
1908 establishments in California